The Language Proficiency Index or LPI is a Canadian standardized test for English proficiency administered by Paragon Testing Enterprises, a subsidiary of the University of British Columbia. The results of the test are used primarily by postsecondary institutions and professional organizations within the Province of British Columbia, Alberta and in the territory of Yukon.

The test is 2.5 hours in length and consists of five parts. Parts I, II, and III are multiple choice. In Parts I and II, the testee must correctly identify various grammar-related mistakes. Part III tests reading comprehension. In Part IV, the testee must summarise various short works of literature. Part V is a 300-400 word argumentative essay.

External links
Language Proficiency Index (LPI) Homepage
Test Scoring

Education in British Columbia